Nalongo and Nupani is a small atoll in the Southwestern Pacific Ocean. It has a coral reef totally encircling a 6 km wide lagoon. Nupani Island, also called Nimba, is inhabited with some 100 people, while Nalongo has no permanent habitation. Administratively, the atoll belongs to the Temotu Province of the Solomon Islands.

References

External links

Polynesian outliers
Atolls of the Solomon Islands